William R. McGuiness (born c. 1946) is the administrative presiding justice of the California Court of Appeal, division three, in San Francisco, California. He served on the Alameda County Superior Court from 1986 until 1997, when he was appointed as Associate Justice to the First Appellate District, Division Four. In 2002 he was elevated to the position of administrative presiding justice of division three in the California Court of Appeal. He is a graduate of Santa Clara University (B.A. 1968), and the University of San Francisco School of Law (J.D. 1972).

References

External links
http://www.courtinfo.ca.gov/courts/courtsofappeal/1stDistrict/justices/mcguiness.htm

1940s births
Living people
Judges of the California Courts of Appeal
Santa Clara University alumni
University of San Francisco alumni